Desert of Fire may refer to:
 Desert of Fire (miniseries), a TV miniseries
 Desert of Fire (1971 film), an Italian adventure film